Louise Imogen Guiney (January 7, 1861  – November 2, 1920) was an American poet, essayist and editor, born in Roxbury, Massachusetts.

Biography

The daughter of Gen. Patrick R. Guiney, an Irish-born American Civil War officer and lawyer, from County Tipperary and Jeannette Margaret Doyle, she was raised Roman Catholic and educated at the Notre Dame convent school in Boston and at the Academy of the Sacred Heart in Providence, Rhode Island, from which she graduated in 1879.

Over the next 20 years, she worked at various jobs, including serving as a postmistress and working in the field of cataloging at the Boston Public Library.  She was a member of several literary and social clubs, and according to her friend Ralph Adams Cram was "the most vital and creative personal influence" on their circle of writers and artists in Boston (see  Visionists).
   

In 1901, Guiney moved to Oxford, England, to focus on her poetry and essay writing. She donated a crucifix sculpture to the church of St Mary and St Nicholas, Littlemore, to mark the centenary of Cardinal Newman's birth in 1901.

She soon began to suffer from illness  and was no longer able to write poetry. She was a contributor to The Atlantic Monthly, Scribner's Magazine, McClure's, Blackwood's Magazine, Dublin Review, The Catholic World, and the Catholic Encyclopedia.

With Gwenllian Morgan, Guiney prepared materials for an edition and biography of the seventeenth-century Anglo-Welsh Metaphysical poet Henry Vaughan. Neither Guiney nor Morgan lived to complete the project, however, but their research was used by F. E. Hutchinson for his 1947 biography Henry Vaughan.
  
Guiney died of a stroke near Gloucestershire, England, at age 59, leaving much of her work unfinished.

Bibliography

Songs at the Start (1884, poetry)
Goose-Quill Papers (1885, essays)
The White Sail and Other Poems (1887, poetry)
Brownies and Bogles (1888, poetry)
Monsieur Henri: A Foot-Note to French History (1892, essays)
A Roadside Harp (1893, poetry)
A Little English Gallery (1895, essays)
Robert Louis Stevenson (1895, biography, with Alice Brown)
Lovers' Saint Ruth's and Three Other Tales (1895, short stories)
Nine Sonnets Written at Oxford (1895, poetry)
Patrins (1897, essays)
James Clarence Mangan, his Selected Poems: With a Study by the Editor (1897, editor)
England and Yesterday (1898, poetry)
The Martyrs' Idyl and Shorter Poems (1899, poetry)
Robert Emmet (1904)
The Princess of the Tower (1906, poetry)
Blessed Edmund Campion (1908)
Happy Ending (1909, poetry, her collected verse)
Letters (1926, letters) (posthumously)
Recusant Poets (1939, ed., with Geoffrey Bliss) (posthumously)

References

Sources
Fairbanks, Henry G., Louise Imogen Guiney,  New York:  Twayne Publishers Inc., 1975.  .
Reichardt, Mary R. (ed.), Catholic Women Writers: A Bio-bibliographical Sourcebook, Portsmouth, NH:  Greenwood Publishing Group, Inc., 2001.  .
Tenison, E.M., Louise Imogen Guiney,: Her Life And Works, 1861-1920, London:  Macmillan, London, 1923. ASIN: B000859GVG 1923.

External links

 
 
 
 Essays by Louise Imogen Guiney at Quotidiana.org
  Louise Imogen Guiney Papers, 1884-1979 (bulk 1884-1921), Vassar College Libraries
 Louise Imogen Guiney Collection: Late nineteenth-century works by this American poet and essayist, (95 titles). From the Rare Book and Special Collections Division at the Library of Congress
 Poems by Louise Imogen Guiney

1861 births
1920 deaths
American essayists
American poets of Irish descent
American Roman Catholic poets
American women essayists
American women poets
Catholics from Massachusetts
Contributors to the Catholic Encyclopedia
Writers from Boston